María Altagarcia García Cáceres (born 10 August 1987, in La Vega) is a Dominican Republican judoka who competes in the women's 52 kg category. She became the first Dominican judoka to win a world championship medal, with a bronze at the 2006 Junior Championship.

García has twice competed at an Olympic Games. She was eliminated at the quarterfinal stage at the 2008 Summer Olympics in Beijing and at the 2012 Summer Olympics, she was defeated in the second round. She has won silver medals at the 2014 Central American and Caribbean Games and 2007 Pan American Judo Championships, and bronze at the 2007 Pan American Games, 2010 Central American and Caribbean Games, and three editions of the Pan American Judo Championships.

References

External links
 
 

Dominican Republic female judoka
1987 births
Living people
Olympic judoka of the Dominican Republic
Judoka at the 2008 Summer Olympics
Judoka at the 2012 Summer Olympics
Pan American Games medalists in judo
Judoka at the 2015 Pan American Games
Pan American Games bronze medalists for the Dominican Republic
Medalists at the 2007 Pan American Games
20th-century Dominican Republic women
21st-century Dominican Republic women